Stefan Bo Anders Billborn (born 15 November 1972) is a Swedish football manager who is the head coach of Sarpsborg 08 in the Norwegian Eliteserien.

Coaching career

Early career
Billborn started his managerial career in 1989, at age 17, by coaching several youth teams at local club Rågsveds IF. He was the youth coach of Stefan Ishizaki, who later became a Swedish international.

Brommapojkarna
In 1997, Billborn moved to IF Brommapojkarna where he worked in different roles in the organisation. He was the academy coach for players John Guidetti, Albin Ekdal, Ludwig Augustinsson and Kristoffer Nordfeldt – who all four went on to play for the Swedish national team and in major European leagues in their professional careers.

Billborn was appointed assistant coach Brommapojkarna's senior team in 2010, first working with manager Kim Bergstrand and then Roberth Björknesjö. 

Before the start of the 2014 season, Billborn was promoted to head coach at Brommapojkarna. The club finished 16th and last in the Allsvenskan table, only claiming 12 points in 30 games. Billborn was sacked in November and left the club.

Hammarby IF
In 2015, Billborn joined Hammarby IF as the new head of their academy. He was appointed assistant coach to manager Jakob Michelsen in Hammarby's senior team in 2017.

2018
On 10 January 2018, Billborn took over as manager of Hammarby IF in Allsvenskan, signing a three year contract. He led the club to a surprising 4th position in the table during his debut season, after being placed first in the league mid-season.

2019
In 2019, Hammarby started the league play in a mediocre fashion, but made a strong finish to the season (with eight straight wins during between match day 22 and 30) and ultimately finished 3rd in Allsvenskan. This meant that the club qualified for the 2020–21 UEFA Europa League, their first continental competition in over ten years.

2020
On 5 January 2020, Billborn signed a new three-year contract with Hammarby, together with his assistant coach Joachim Björklund. In a season postponed due to the COVID-19 pandemic, the side disappointedly finished 8th in the table. The club won 3–0 against Puskás Akadémia in the first round of the 2020–21 UEFA Europa League, but was eliminated from the tournament in the second round against Lech Poznań through a 0–3 loss.

2021
On 30 May 2021, Billborn won the 2020–21 Svenska Cupen with Hammarby IF, through a 5–4 win on penalties (0–0 after full-time) against BK Häcken in the final. On 11 June 2021, Hammarby decided to terminate Billborn's contract, with the club placed 8th in the 2021 Allsvenskan table after eight rounds.

Sarpsborg 08
On 7 January 2022, Billborn was appointed head coach of Norwegian Eliteserien club Sarpsborg 08. Two days later, Billborn appointed Joachim Björklund from Hammarby as his assistant coach.

Managerial statistics

Honours

Manager
Hammarby IF
 Svenska Cupen: 2020–21

References

1972 births
Living people
Swedish football managers
Allsvenskan managers
IF Brommapojkarna managers
Hammarby Fotboll non-playing staff
Hammarby Fotboll managers
Sarpsborg 08 FF managers
Swedish expatriate football managers
Expatriate football managers in Norway
Sportspeople from Stockholm